SR6 may refer to:

 SR postcode area
 FYFT SR-series unmanned blimp
 Either of two designations for U.S. Routes in Utah:
 U.S. Route 6 in Utah (by Utah State law, U.S. Route 6 within the state has been defined as "State Route 6" since 1977)
 Utah State Route 6 (1910-1977), the former state designation for section of U.S. Route 40 (east of junctions near Park City) within northeastern Utah, United States
 Washington State Route 6
 3190 Aposhanskij
 Stinson SR-6 Reliant

See also 
 List of highways numbered 6